3DFlow, srl is an Italian software house operating in the field of Computer Vision and Image Processing.  It was established in 2011 as a spin-off of the University of Verona and in  2012 it became a spin-off of the University of Udine.

Most known for its photogrammetry software 3DF Zephyr that allows the user to automatically create 3D models starting with a random set of pictures, 3DFlow is also involved as a consulting company with other well known software house such as Activision  and Quantel. Part of its technology has been made available for free  such as 3DF Samantha and JLinkage which overall have been cited on more than 50 papers.

Products
 3DF Zephyr
 3DF Masquerade
 3DF Samantha
 3DF Stasia
 3DF Sasha
 3DF Lapyx

See also
3D data acquisition and object reconstruction
Photogrammetry

References

External links
 3DFlow Official site

Software companies of Italy
Commercial computer vision systems
Photogrammetry organizations